Moses Matovu is a Ugandan musician and saxophonist. He is one of the founders of Afrigo Band, Uganda's longest-lasting band, founded in 1975.

Early childhood and education
Matovu was born on 19 June 1949 in Kawempe Division, Kampala District to Abdallah Bukenya and Solome Nakitto. When his parents separated, he moved to Mengo, with his mother at the age of five. He spent most of his childhood with his mother. He attended Namirembe Primary School and later Kibuli Secondary School. He also attended Pillai's Secondary School. However, Matovu's education was cut short in 1966 when traditional institutions were abolished. He was on scholarship from Buganda Kingdom. With no opportunity to continue in school, Matovu concentrated on football and also joined the music industry in 1967 as a vocalist with the Thunderbirds Band.

Music
Matovu has been in Uganda's music industry for close to 45 years. He started out in Thunderbirds Band in 1967 as a vocalist. From there, he joined the Police Band in 1968 and later Cranes Band in 1969 before he and other friends formed Afrigo Band in 1974. He has been performing with the band since and is its leader, as of February 2015.

Discography
Some of the records and albums he has released are with Afrigo Band:

References

External links 
 2012 Interview With Afrigo's Moses Matovu (Luganda)

1949 births
20th-century Ugandan male singers
Living people
People from Kampala District
Ganda people
Members of Afrigo Band
Ugandan singer-songwriters
21st-century Ugandan male singers